Alejandro "Álex" Fernández Iglesias (born 15 October 1992) is a Spanish professional footballer who plays as a central midfielder for Cádiz CF.

Formed at Real Madrid, where he made two first-team appearances, he spent most of his career at Cádiz, playing over 180 times. In La Liga, he also represented Espanyol.

Club career

Real Madrid
Born in Madrid, Fernández joined Real Madrid's youth system from neighbouring RSD Alcalá, aged 12. In 2010, he started appearing with Real Madrid Castilla in Segunda División B and, in July of that year, he was called by first-team coach José Mourinho to a preseason tour in the United States. He made his unofficial debut on 5 August in a friendly against Club América (3–2 win), with his brother Nacho also making his first appearance that day.

Fernández made his league debut with the B side on 29 August 2010, playing 87 minutes in a 3–2 home win against Coruxo FC. On 3 October he scored his first goal, contributing to the 3–0 home victory over AD Cerro de Reyes. He finished his first season with 32 games and two goals, as the team fell short in the promotion playoffs.

On 6 March 2011, Fernández made his La Liga debut, playing the last minute of a 3–1 defeat of Racing de Santander. He contributed 35 appearances in the 2011–12 campaign – playoffs included – with Castilla returning to the second tier after five years.

Espanyol
Fernández left Real Madrid in August 2013, by mutual consent. He signed shortly after with RCD Espanyol in the top level, appearing in 30 competitive matches in his first year but starting in only five.

On 28 January 2015, Espanyol loaned Fernández to HNK Rijeka until the end of the season. On 18 August, he joined Championship club Reading on loan, with a view to a permanent move at the end of the campaign. He scored his first goal for them on 19 January 2016, in a 5–2 home win against Huddersfield Town in the third round in the FA Cup.

Elche and Cádiz
On 31 August 2016, shortly after terminating his contract with the Pericos, due to expire the following year, Fernández signed for Elche CF. The following 7 August, after suffering relegation, he agreed to a two-year deal with fellow Segunda División team Cádiz CF. 

With a total of 11 goals, Fernández was his team's top scorer in 2019. He scored 13 during the season from 41 appearances, in a return to the top flight as runners-up.

In 2020–21, Fernández contributed four goals – bettered in the team only by Álvaro Negredo's eight – as the Andalusian side stayed up in 12th place; he missed the final two months with a right knee injury. On 6 June 2022, he extended his contract until 2025.

Personal life
Fernández's older brother, Nacho, is also a footballer. A defender, he also graduated from Real Madrid's academy but remained there while Álex moved on. Their physical appearance is quite dissimilar, owing to Álex's red hair.

Career statistics

Honours
Real Madrid Castilla
Segunda División B: 2011–12

Spain U19
UEFA European Under-19 Championship: 2011

Individual	
UEFA European Under-19 Championship Golden Player: 2011

References

External links

1992 births
Living people
Spanish footballers
Footballers from Madrid
Association football midfielders
La Liga players
Segunda División players
Segunda División B players
RSD Alcalá players
Real Madrid Castilla footballers
Real Madrid CF players
RCD Espanyol footballers
Elche CF players
Cádiz CF players
Croatian Football League players
HNK Rijeka players
English Football League players
Reading F.C. players
Spain youth international footballers
Spanish expatriate footballers
Expatriate footballers in Croatia
Expatriate footballers in England
Spanish expatriate sportspeople in Croatia
Spanish expatriate sportspeople in England